Montmagny Airport  is located  northeast of Montmagny, Quebec, Canada.

References

Certified airports in Chaudière-Appalaches
Montmagny, Quebec